Saint Joseph Boulevard may refer to:
 Saint Joseph Boulevard, Montreal
 Boulevard Saint-Joseph, Gatineau
 St. Joseph Boulevard, Ottawa